Thomas Lyttelton may refer to:

Sir Thomas Lyttelton, 1st Baronet (1593–1650), English Royalist officer and politician
Sir Thomas Lyttelton, 4th Baronet (1686–1751), MP for Worcestershire 1721–1734; Camelford 1734–1741; Lord of the Admiralty
Thomas Lyttelton, 2nd Baron Lyttelton (1744–1779), British MP for Bewdley, 1768 and profligate, dubbed "the wicked Lord Lyttelton" and "bad Lord Lyttelton"
Thomas Lyttelton (MP for Coventry), MP for Coventry, 1540
Thomas Lyttelton, 3rd Viscount Chandos (born 1953), British politician for the Labour Party

See also 
 Thomas Littleton (disambiguation)